Southworth & Hawes was an early photographic firm in Boston, 1843–1863. Its partners, Albert Sands Southworth (1811–1894) and Josiah Johnson Hawes (1808–1901), have been hailed as the first great American masters of photography, whose work elevated photographic portraits to the level of fine art. Their images are prominent in every major book and collection of early American photography.

Southworth & Hawes worked almost exclusively in the daguerreotype process. Working in the 8 ½ x 6 ½ inch whole plate format, their images are brilliant, mirror-like, and finely detailed. Writing in the Photographic and Fine Art Journal, August 1855, the contemporary Philadelphia daguerreotypist Marcus Aurelius Root paid them this praise: "Their style, indeed, is peculiar to themselves; presenting beautiful effects of light and shade, and giving depth and roundness together with a wonderful softness or mellowness. These traits have achieved for them a high reputation with all true artists and connoisseurs." He further noted that the firm had devoted their time chiefly to daguerreotypes, with little attention to photography on paper.

History

Personal and public portraits 
During their 20 years of collaboration, Southworth & Hawes catered to Boston society and the famous. Their advertisements drew a distinction between the appropriate styles for personal versus public portraiture. "A likeness for an intimate acquaintance or one’s own family should be marked by that amiability and cheerfulness, so appropriate to the social circle and the home fireside. Those for the public, of official dignitaries and celebrated characters admit of more firmness, sternness and soberness." Among their sitters were Louisa May Alcott, Lyman Beecher, Benjamin Butler, William Ellery Channing, Rufus Choate, Cassius Marcellus Clay, Charlotte Cushman, Richard Henry Dana, Jr., Dorothea Dix, Ralph Waldo Emerson, Edward Everett, William Lloyd Garrison, Grace Greenwood, Oliver Wendell Holmes, Sam Houston, Thomas Starr King, Louis Kossuth, Jenny Lind, Henry Wadsworth Longfellow, Horace Mann, Donald McKay, Lola Montez, George Peabody, William H. Prescott, Lemuel Shaw, Harriet Beecher Stowe, Charles Sumner, Daniel Webster, John Greenleaf Whittier, and Robert C. Winthrop.

Documenting the birth of surgical anesthesia 

On the evening of September 30, 1846, Mr. Eben Frost, suffering from a violent toothache, called upon Dr. William Thomas Green Morton, a dentist at No. 19 Tremont Row, Boston. Dr. Morton administered nitrous oxide and extracted the tooth. Less than three weeks later, the so-called "Death of Pain" took place on October 16, when Dr. Morton administered ether to a patient before Dr. John Collins Warren, senior surgeon at the Massachusetts General Hospital, removed a tumor from his neck. Although it is believed that ether anesthesia had been administered for surgery earlier, most notably by Dr. Crawford Long in Jefferson Georgia on March 30, 1843, it had been done privately and not reported in the medical literature.  Morton's public demonstration of general anesthesia was therefore historic. To commemorate this momentous event, Southworth & Hawes were asked to daguerreotype the operation; however Hawes was squeamish about the blood, and they photographed a re-enactment instead. On April 3, 1847, Southworth & Hawes were called upon to record an actual operation, again with the patient under ether. Later Dr. Warren presented his Laundy scalpel and probe, the surgical instruments he used in the first operation, to Hawes in gratitude for recording the operations.

(Three or four weeks later, they documented Dr. Warren yet again. In honor of his ether discovery, and of his distinguished career as professor of anatomy at Harvard Medical School, they arranged and composed a mock anatomy dissection, with the principal subject being Dr. Warren himself.)

Dispersion of the archives 
Hawes lived until 1901, continuing to operate a studio and carefully protecting its sizeable archive. The archives were finally dispersed during the Great Depression. Most made their way into three museums (George Eastman House, Metropolitan Museum of Art and Museum of Fine Arts, Boston), while only a comparatively few have ever been privately held. However, on April 27, 1999, a previously unknown hoard of 240 Southworth & Hawes daguerreotypes appeared at Sotheby's auction from the estate of David Feigenbaum. The total sales price realized was $3.3 million.

Image gallery

Portrait subjects

 Alvin Adams
 Brooks Adams
 John Quincy Adams
 Marietta Alboni
 Stephen Allen
 Susan B. Anthony
 Nathan Appleton
 William Appleton
 D.C. Bacon
 Ellen B. Bacon
 Nathan Prentiss Banks
 Gaetano Bedini
 Henry Ward Beecher
 Lyman Beecher
 Elise Biscaccianti
 George Sewall Boutwell
 Henry I. Bowdich
 Laura Dewey Bridgman
 George Nixon Briggs
 Louise Winsor Brooks
 Samuel Gilman Brown
 Elizabeth Dwight Cabot
 Edward Tyrrel Channing
 Seth Wells Cheney
 Jonas Chickering
 Francis James Child
 Thomas Childs
 James Freeman Clarke
 Cassius Marcellus Clay
 Henry Clay
 C.W. Couldock
 Henry Clifford Curtis
 Charlotte Cushman
 Henry Dexter
 Dorothea Dix
 John Dixwell
 Mrs. F.N. Drew
 Rufus Ellis
 Ralph Waldo Emerson
 Edward Everett
 Cornelia Conway Felton
 Annie Adams Fields
 James Thomas Fields
 Millard Fillmore
 John Fiske
 Benjamin F. French
 William Frick
 Margaret Fuller
 William Lloyd Garrison
 Mary Gleason
 Otto Goldschmidt
 Charles Goodyear
 Augustus Addison Gould
 Mary Apthorp Quincy Gould
 Simon Greenleaf
 Grace Greenwood
 Matilda Hays
 James Shuttleworth Haywood
 George Peter Alexander Healy
 Oliver Wendell Holmes
 Mary Wood Hooper
 Erastus Hopkins
 Elias Howe
 James Jackson (1777–1867)
 William Jenks
 Gerrit P. Judd
 Kamehameha IV i.e. Prince Lot Kapuiwa (1830–1872)
 Kamehameha V i.e. Prince Alexander Liholiho Iolani (1834–1863)
 Sarah P. Keyes
 Joseph Kimball
 Thomas Starr King
 Edward Norris Kirk
 Louis Kossuth
 Amos Lawrence
 Jenny Lind
 Henry Wadsworth Longfellow
 James Jackson Lowell
 John S. Lurman
 Alice Lyman
 Cornelia F. Malchett
 Theodore Malchett
 Horace Mann
 Donald McKay
 Mary Minot
 Sarah Cabot Minot
 Lola Montez
 Fannie Morey
 Commodore Charles Morris
 Rollin Heber Neale
 Edwards Amasa Park
 Francis Parkman
 John Howard Payne
 Frank Everett Peabody
 George Peabody
 Benjamin Peirce
 Wendell Phillips
 Franklin Pierce
 Mrs. G.W. Pratt
 William Gardner Prescott
 William Hickling Prescott
 Ferencz Pulszky
 Charles Francis Richardson
 Baron James Rothschild
 Truman Henry Safford
 Leverett Saltonstall
 Benjamin Seaver
 Daniel Sharp
 Lemuel Shaw
 A.L. Simpson
 William T. Smithett
 Jared Sparks
 Charles Sprague
 Calvin Ellis Stowe
 Harriet Beecher Stowe
 Charles Sumner
 Caroline Sturgis Tappan
 Zachary Taylor
 George Thompson
 Edward S. Tobey
 Elisabeth Sprague Tobey
 John L. Tucker
 Katherine Parker Tucker
 Ellen Dwight Twisleton
 Bennet Tyler
 Adrian Vandeveer
 Captain Jonathan Walker
 James Lester Wallack
 John Collins Warren
 William Warren
 Daniel Webster
 Benjamin F. White
 Robert Charles Winthrop
 John Ellis Wool
 Jeffries Wyman

Museums with Southworth & Hawes collections 
 American Museum of Photography
 Amon Carter Museum of Ft. Worth, Texas
 Boston Athenæum
 George Eastman House
 Historic New England
 Metropolitan Museum of Art
 Museum of Fine Arts, Boston

References

External links

Becky Simmons Albert Sands Southworth and Josiah Johnson Hawes Biography George Eastman House
 https://www.flickr.com/photos/george_eastman_house/sets/72157606223836462/ Works by Southworth & Hawes, from the George Eastman House
 https://web.archive.org/web/20090912080225/http://museum.icp.org/museum/exhibitions/southworth_hawes/pages/intro.html Exhibition at the International Center of Photography, 2005
 http://www.metmuseum.org/toah/hi/hi_southworthalbertsands.htm Works in the Metropolitan Museum
 Museum of Fine Arts, Boston, works by Southworth & Hawes

Photographic studios
19th-century American photographers
Artists from Boston
Business duos
Financial District, Boston
19th century in Boston
Cultural history of Boston
Art duos
Photography companies of the United States